Synapse is a science fiction thriller directed by music video director Kenlon Clark. The screenplay was written by Adam G. Simon who also penned the original story and screenplay for Man Down. Simon also stars in the film alongside Sophina Brown, Henry Simmons, Joshua Alba, Charley Boon and Will Rubio. The sound design for the film was done by Emmy Award winning sound designer Michael Archacki and the score was created by Christian Davis.

Synapse is the first theatrical content produced by Los Angeles Center Studios and Hollywood Locations.

Plot
The film takes places in a future where a bio tech narcotic has become the drug of choice for addicts and dealers. “Mems” as they are called, allows the user to download memories provided by “Mem Farmers.”  The story follows an addicted memory dealer Nathan Stafford as he is chased relentlessly by federal narcotics agents bent on keeping the secrets he has locked in his mind hidden.

Cast
Adam G. Simon as Nathan Stafford
Sophina Brown as Aamina McDavitt
Henry Simmons as Agent 805
Joshua Alba as Frank McDavitt
Charley Boon as Agent 702
Will Rubio as Freddy

References

External links
 
  at Synapse the Film
  at Movie Pilot
  at MVP Life

2015 films
Films directed by Olivier Megaton
Films set in Los Angeles
Films shot in Los Angeles
American science fiction thriller films
2010s science fiction thriller films
2010s English-language films
2010s American films